Kazimierz Kay-Skrzypecki (or Skrzypeski) (25 November 1905 – 22 January 1964) was a Polish-born British luge racer.

Skrzypecki was a former pilot in the Royal Air Force. He died from injuries sustained during one of the training runs for the first Olympic luge competition at the 1964 Winter Olympics in Innsbruck. He suffered a fractured skull, fractured pelvis, and other injuries in the accident. He died the next day when his heart stopped during an emergency operation. Days later, on 26 January 1964, Australian downhill skier Ross Milne also died. The Opening Ceremonies of the Games were held on 29 January 1964.

References

1905 births
1964 deaths
1964 Winter Olympics
British aviators
British male lugers
Lugers at the 1964 Winter Olympics
Olympic deaths
Olympic lugers of Great Britain
Place of birth missing
Polish emigrants to the United Kingdom
Polish male lugers
Polish Royal Air Force pilots of World War II
Sport deaths in Austria